"Step Back" is the debut single recorded by South Korean supergroup Got the Beat, the first unit of South Korean project group Girls on Top. It was released digitally on January 3, 2022 by SM Entertainment. Described as a "hip-hop R&B song", it was written by Yoo Young-jin, who also composed it with Dwayne Abernathy Jr., Taylor Monet Parks, and Ryan Jhun. The track is about a woman with high self-esteem warning another woman away from approaching her lover.

Background and composition 
On December 26, 2021, SM Entertainment launched a new female project group called Girls on Top, along with its first unit Got the Beat. The first teaser image of the unit was released through Girls on Top and SM Town's official social media accounts. From December 28 to 29, teaser images were released for each individual group member (in order: BoA, Taeyeon, Seulgi, Winter, Hyoyeon, Wendy, Karina).
"Step Back" was composed by Dwayne Abernathy Jr., Taylor Monet Parks, and Ryan Jhun, along with Yoo Young-jin, who also wrote the Korean lyrics of the song. The song was written by Yoo and was widely known as the SM Music Performance (SMP) representative, which features strong performances and critical social lyrics unique to SM Entertainment. Musically, it was described as an "addictive" hip-hop R&B song with repeated bass and instrument variations. Lim Sun-hee of IZM mentioned the twisted string instrument sound and added that as the chorus progresses, the chaos decreases while noting Yoo Young-jin's chorus appearance and comparing it to the SMP concept of SuperM. Tim Chan of Rolling Stone noted the dubstep, hip-hop, and electro house elements incorporated in the bass-heavy track with Got the Beat "alternating between singing, rapping, and a cheerleader chant-style chorus". The song was also noted for the group's "unique" vocals and "solid" singing skills that enhanced the "perfection" of the single. It is composed in the key of C-sharp major, with a tempo of 162 beats per minute. The lyrics contain "straightforward" expressions of a woman with high self-esteem in love with her lover.

Critical reception 

Following its release, "Step Back" was met with mixed to negative reviews from music critics, with praise for the vocals but criticism for the lyrics. Kim Yoon-ha of Channel Yes noted the words like unrequited love, childhood play, and memories in front of their eyes, and Got the Beat saying, "My man is on Another Level, you can't even dream about". Kim pointed out that the lyrics were "unexpected", and the situation could have been fully anticipated for those who have accepted and enjoyed SM Music Performance (SMP) regardless of their likes or dislikes. Benedetta Geddo of Teen Vogue called it a "swagger-filled" song that showcases the group's "impeccable" vocals we are used to hearing from SM Entertainment artists. Kim Soo-jung of No Cut News mentioned the "high-pitched launch" section of the song and praised it for being able to digest "leisurely". However, Kim condemned the lyrics for criticizing another woman for approaching her lover and stated that people who have heard the lyrics read its explanation as deception or mockery. She also noted that it was also "awkward" to recall that it is 2022 but assumed that these materials and contents could become the track's lyrics anyway.

Haley Yang of Korea JoongAng Daily pointed out the track's melody as it was "seeing overwhelmingly positive reviews as members flaunt impressive high notes" but noted that many fans were "perplexed" as to why the song was introduced as a "girl power anthem". Yang also indicated the responses of fans to such lamenting that "everything is perfect except the lyrics", "mentioning male attention to validate their confidence", and calling the lyrics "so out-of-trend" and "anachronistic". She commented that the lyrics "internalized misogyny by antagonizing another woman and accusing her of being flirtatious" and perpetuating the age-old phrase, "women are women's worst enemies". Mary Siroky of Consequence described the track as "less of an empowerment anthem" and noted that it had seemingly left many fans "disappointed" from what the group was marketed for. Ryu Ji-hoon of Dailian stated the disappointment and dissatisfaction of fans due to outdated lyrics of the song such as "My man is on Another Level / You can't even dream about this Level", "Take your Hands off of mine," and "This isn't the place for you".

Gelene Peñalosa of Inquirer Pop! described the track as a "gaslight, gatekeep, girlboss" anthem and condemned the song's lyricist as she describes it as "very anti-feminist and gives off a very strong feeling of being written by a man". Tamar Herman of South China Morning Post called it a "stereotypical and anti-feminist" song, even adding that South Korean music critic Jung Min-jae suggested that the lyrics be rewritten and the single re-released. Cho Hye-jin of Xports News noted that the lyrics were a "disappointment" with the combination of SM Entertainment's female artists representing the generation includes lyrics that go against the times. Lim Sun-hee of IZM cited the track's chorus containing "unique solemnity" in the intro and described it as "boring" because of its long duration. She also criticized the lyrics for being full of "rambling and demeaning" narratives. Lim stated that Got the Beat were not the main characters of the song as it focuses on pushing back other people who were limited to women. She concluded that the group's "strong" vocal skills and ability to be placed ideally struggle to lead the single and rated it one point five stars out of five.

Commercial performance 
"Step Back" debuted at number 24 on South Korea's Gaon Digital Chart in the chart issue dated January 2–8, 2022, ascending to number 14 in the chart issue dated January 9–15, 2022. The song also debuted at number 4, number 41, and number 84 on Gaon Download Chart, Gaon Streaming Chart, and Gaon BGM Chart, respectively, in the chart issue dated January 2–8, 2022. The song then ascended to number 17 on Gaon Streaming Chart in the chart issue dated January 9–15, 2022. The song debuted at number 77 on the Billboard K-pop Hot 100 in the chart issue dated January 15, 2022. The song then ascended to number 15 in the chart issue dated January 29, 2022. In Japan, the song debuted at number 69 on the Billboard Japan Japan Hot 100 in the chart issue dated January 12, 2022. The song also debuted at number two on the component Heatseekers Songs chart. It also debuted at numbers 41 and 90 on the component Top Download Songs chart and Top Streaming Songs chart.

In New Zealand, the song debuted at number 19 on RMNZ Hot Singles in the chart issue dated January 10, 2022. In Indonesia, the song debuted and peaked at number 12 on the Billboard Indonesia Songs in the chart issue dated February 19, 2022. In Singapore, the song debuted at number 14 on RIAS's Top Streaming Chart in the chart issue dated January 7–13, 2022. It also debuted at number 13 on the RIAS Top Regional Chart in the chart issue dated December 31, 2021 – January 6, 2022, peaking at number seven in the chart issued a week later. In Vietnam, the song debuted at number 24 on the Billboard Vietnam Hot 100 in the chart issue dated January 14, 2022, peaking at number 19 in the chart issued a week later.

In the United States, the song debuted at number five on the Billboard World Digital Song Sales in the chart issue dated January 15, 2022. Globally, the song debuted at number 126 on the Billboard Global 200 in the chart issue dated January 15, 2022, peaking at number 122 in the chart issue dated January 22, 2022. It also debuted at number 87 on the Billboard Global Excl. US in the chart issue dated January 15, 2022, peaking at number 69 in the chart issued a week later.

Promotion 

On January 1, 2022, Got the Beat unveiled their first "Step Back" performance stage at the SM Town Live 2022: SMCU Express at Kwangya. For the performance, choreography by Kiel Tutin, ReiNa, and Kyle Hanagami, who have worked with Jennifer Lopez and Britney Spears, was commissioned. The first stage video performance of the song was released after the concert and was posted on YouTube. It starts with the group's faces covered with their arms as the members look back and dance until their part. The members have also "actively" utilized pair choreography, naturally flows into group choreography, and distribute spotlights evenly so that no one is suppressed. With that, Kim Soo-jung of No Cut News praised the camera work of the SM for maximizing the strength of the stage video. The song's stage video features the "powerful" vocals of Taeyeon, Wendy, and Winter, along with the dance break of BoA, Hyoyeon, and Seulgi, adding Hyoyeon and Karina's "individualistic rap". Moon Soo-ji of Inews24 noted the "heated" response the group was receiving by releasing the stage video and praising it for being a "thorough" video with "perfect vocal, dance, and rap skills", drawing admiration. Before their first performance, SM Entertainment also released a practice video of the group. The group performed the song on Mnet's M Countdown on January 27, 2022.

Accolades

Credits and personnel 
Credits adapted from Joox and Melon.

Studio

 SM Booming System – recording, digital editing, mixing
 Sonic Korea – mastering

Personnel

 Got the Beat (BoA, Taeyeon, Hyoyeon, Seulgi, Wendy, Karina, Winter) – vocals
 Yoo Young-jin – lyrics, composition, arrangement, vocal directing, background vocals, recording, digital editing, mixing, music and sound supervisor
 Dwayne Abernathy Jr. – composition, arrangement
 Taylor Monet Parks – composition
 Ryan Jhun – composition, arrangement
 Jeon Hoon – mastering
 Shin Soo-min – mastering assistant

Charts

Weekly charts

Monthly charts

Year-end charts

Release history

See also 

 List of Inkigayo Chart winners (2022)
 List of M Countdown Chart winners (2022)

References 

2022 songs
2022 debut singles
Korean-language songs
SM Entertainment singles
Songs written by Yoo Young-jin
Songs written by Dem Jointz
Songs written by Tayla Parx
Songs written by Ryan S. Jhun
South Korean hip hop songs
South Korean contemporary R&B songs